Mimeirhel Benita (born 17 November 2003) is a Dutch professional footballer who plays for Eredivisie club Feyenoord.

Club career 
Mimeirhel Benita made his professional debut for Feyenoord on the 26 August 2021, coming out of the bench for the last few minutes of 3–1 away loss to Elfsborg, the last match of a successful Conference League qualification campaign. He became an official member of the club's first team squad in August 2022.

Career statistics

References

External links
Profile at the Feyenoord website

2003 births
Living people
People from Spijkenisse
Dutch footballers
Netherlands youth international footballers
Dutch people of Curaçao descent
Association football defenders
Feyenoord players
Eredivisie players
Footballers from South Holland